Pince–Marof is a settlement southeast of Lendava in the Prekmurje region of Slovenia. It lies close to the border with Hungary and its territory extends to the extreme eastern point of Slovenia.

References

External links
Pince–Marof on Geopedia

Populated places in the Municipality of Lendava